Petersen is a 1974 Australian drama film directed by Tim Burstall.

Petersen was a box office success and received wide distribution in the UK and US under the title Jock Petersen. Petersen is first and foremost a sobering critique of Australian life in the early 1970s. Petersen is considered one of the better social dramas from the early years of the Australian film revival. Stanley Kubrick praised the film on its release, particularly Burstall's direction and Jack Thompson's lead performance. Jack Thompson won the Hoyts Prize for Best Performance at the 1975 AFI Awards for his performance in Petersen.

Plot
Tony Petersen is an electrical tradesman and former football star who is studying arts at the University of Melbourne, and majoring in English. Despite being married to adoring wife Susie, he is having an affair with his lecturer, Trish Kent, and has a fling with student Moira as part of a protest. The professor is also seeing one of his students after class. Petersen and the professor's wife talk about having a baby. Trish's husband Charles fails Petersen in his exams and Trish leaves for Oxford. Petersen rapes Trish and returns to his old life.

Cast
Jack Thompson as Tony Petersen
Jacki Weaver as Susie Petersen
Wendy Hughes as Dr. Patricia 'Trish' Kent
Belinda Giblin as Moira
Arthur Dignam as Prof. Charles Kent
Charles "Bud" Tingwell as Reverend Petersen
Helen Morse as Jane
John Ewart as Peter
David Phillips as Heinz
Christine Amor as Annie
Sheila Florance as Tony's Mother
Sandy Macgregor as Marg
Joey Hohenfels as Debbie
Amanda Hunt as Carol
George Mallaby as executive
Anne Pendlebury as Peggy
Dina Mann as Robyin

Production
Burstall wanted to make the story as the first film from Hexagon Productions and commissioned David Williamson to write a screenplay, the original title of which was Sittin' and Tony Petersen. However Williamson was working on many projects at the time so Hexagon made two Alvin Purple films instead.

Burstall claimed that Graham Burke of Heaxgon did not want to make Petersen, so Burstall tried to get funding from the Australian Film Development Corporation, but when they rejected the film Hexagon came on board. The film also used the working title Campus.

Jack Thompson was paid $1,000 a week. It was Wendy Hughes first film and she later said "I didn't know whether I was Arthur or Martha half the time".

Reception
Critical reception to the film was harsh however Petersen grossed $1,363,000 at the box office in Australia, which is equivalent to $9,200,250 in 2009 dollars. Burstall says it made a profit of $70,000 from its Australian release alone. The film was also released in the US and UK and made a star of Jack Thompson.

Home media
Petersen was released for the first time on DVD by Umbrella Entertainment in October 2016.

See also
Cinema of Australia

References

External links

Petersen at the Australian screen
Petersen at Oz Movies

1974 films
Australian drama films
Films shot in Melbourne
Films directed by Tim Burstall
Films set in Melbourne
Embassy Pictures films
1974 drama films
1970s English-language films
English-language drama films